John Murray (born 4 December 1966) is an English sports broadcaster, senior commentator and Football Correspondent for BBC Radio 5 Live.

Biography 

John Murray was brought up on a family farm in Northumberland, which straddles Hadrian's Wall. He was educated at Haydon Bridge High School and studied geography at the  University of Wales, Lampeter. His career in radio began at TFM Radio on Teesside. He joined BBC Tees in 1994. In 1995 he transferred to the BBC Radio Sport department in London and, by 1998, he had become part of the football commentary team.

He has also commentated on Golf, Cricket and Olympic Equestrian. Murray made his FA Cup final commentary debut on 5 Live on 15 May 2010, describing Chelsea's 1–0 victory over Portsmouth alongside Ingham. He is now established as the first choice Sunday 4:30pm commentator.

In August 2014 John Murray followed in the footsteps of Bryon Butler and Mike Ingham by becoming the BBC's Football Correspondent.

He lives in North Yorkshire with his family.

References 

1966 births
Living people
British sports broadcasters
Alumni of the University of Wales, Lampeter
People from Northumberland